The 1942 National Football League Draft was held on December 22, 1941, at the Palmer House Hotel in Chicago. Two members of the draft class have been inducted into the Pro Football Hall of Fame, Bill Dudley, the first overall selection by the Pittsburgh Steelers, and Mac Speedie, 135th overall selection by the Detroit Lions. Additionally, one member of the draft class became a Naismith Memorial Basketball Hall of Fame college basketball coach, Ralph Miller. Miller was selected 167th pick overall by the Brooklyn Dodgers after successful careers at Kansas on the school's football and basketball teams.

Player selections

Round one

Round two

Round three

Round four

Round five

Round six

Round seven

Round eight

Round nine

Round ten

Round eleven

Round twelve

Round thirteen

Round fourteen

Round fifteen

Round sixteen

Round seventeen

Round eighteen

Round nineteen

Round twenty

Round twenty-one

Round twenty-two

Hall of Famers
 Bill Dudley, halfback from Virginia taken 1st round 1st overall by the Pittsburgh Steelers.
Inducted: Professional Football Hall of Fame class of 1966.
 Mac Speedie, end from Utah taken 15th round 135th overall by the Detroit Lions.
Inducted: Professional Football Hall of Fame Class of 2020

Notable undrafted players

References

External links
 NFL.com – 1942 Draft
 databaseFootball.com – 1942 Draft
 Pro Football Hall of Fame

National Football League Draft
Draft
December 1941 sports events
1941 in sports in Illinois
1940s in Chicago
American football in Chicago
Events in Chicago